The Libera Award for Best Live Act is an award presented by the American Association of Independent Music at the annual Libera Award which recognizes "best live concert performances by an independent label" since 2013.

Winners and nominees

Artists with multiple wins
2 wins
Alabama Shakes

Artists with multiple nominations
4 nominations
Run the Jewels

2 nominations
Alabama Shakes
Charles Bradley
Father John Misty
Flying Lotus
Fontaines D.C.
King Gizzard & the Lizard Wizard
Queens of the Stone Age
St. Vincent

References

External links

Best Live Act